Grant Weatherstone (27 June 1931 – 2 January 2020) was a Scotland international rugby union player. Weatherstone played as a winger.

Rugby union career

Amateur career
Weatherstone played for Stewart's College FP.

Provincial career
Weatherstone represented Edinburgh District.

International career
He was capped for  16 times from 1952 to 1959.

References

1931 births
2020 deaths
Scottish rugby union players
Scotland international rugby union players
Stewart's College FP players
Edinburgh District (rugby union) players
Rugby union players from Edinburgh
Rugby union wings